1845 in sports describes the year's events in world sport.

Baseball
Events
 23 September — formal organisation of the Knickerbocker Base Ball Club or New York Knickerbockers, initiated by Alexander Joy Cartwright, including adoption of twenty rules. Fourteen of the club rules are the earliest known written rules for playing baseball 
 22 October — New York Morning News publishes the first known box score for a baseball game, played at Elysian Fields, Hoboken, New Jersey in Hoboken, New Jersey

Boxing
Events
 9 September — William "Bendigo" Thompson finally returns to the ring after recovery from his serious knee injury.  He fights Ben Caunt at Stony Stratford for the Championship of England and is victorious after 93 rounds when Caunt is disqualified for going down without having been struck.  Caunt denies the accusation and announces his retirement, leaving Bendigo as undisputed champion.

Cricket
Events
 21 & 22 August — the present Surrey County Cricket Club is formed at a meeting which takes place at the new Kennington Oval during a match between two local teams
England
 Most runs – Fuller Pilch 569 @ 21.07 (HS 117)
 Most wickets – William Hillyer 174 @ 12.30 (BB 8–30)

Football
Events
 Written version of Rugby School football rules which allow the ball to be carried and passed by hand.  These rules are the earliest that are definitely known to have been written.  They are a major step in the evolution of rugby league and rugby union; not to mention Australian rules football, American football, Gaelic football, etc.  The Rugby School rules make a clear distinction between the "handling" game and the "dribbling" game.  Dribbling is running with the ball at one's feet.
 Although Eton College rules allow the ball to be touched and controlled by hand, they do not allow running with the ball in the hand or passing of the ball by hand.  So, whereas Rugby School has effectively created the first "handling game" rules, Eton could have created the earliest rules of the "dribbling game".
 Introduction of referees at Eton.  Linesmen at the time are called umpires.

Horse racing
England
 Grand National – Cure-All
 1,000 Guineas Stakes – Picnic 
 2,000 Guineas Stakes – Idas
 The Derby – The Merry Monarch
 The Oaks – Refraction 
 St. Leger Stakes – The Baron

Rowing
The Boat Race
 15 March — Cambridge wins the 7th Oxford and Cambridge Boat Race, a revival of the race last contested in 1842

References

 
Sports by year